Chang Lake, may refer to:

Chang Lake (Hubei), a lake in Hubei, China.
Chang Lake (Yunnan), a lake in Yunnan, China.